The South East Asian Games is a biennial event which began in 1959 known as the Southeast Asian Peninsular Games. Athletics has been one of the sports held at the Games since the inaugural edition. Records are maintained by the Southeast Asian Games Federation and set by athletes who are representing one of the 11 countries of Southeast Asia.

Men's records

Women's records

Mixed Records

Record holders' rankings

By nation

See also
Athletics at the Southeast Asian Games
List of Southeast Asian Games gold medalists in athletics

References

Southeast Asian Games

Records athletics
Athletics
Southeast Asian Games